Municipal associations are statutory corporations or public bodies created by statute in the German federal states of Bavaria, Saxony, Thuringia, and Schleswig-Holstein. In Baden-Württemberg the term stipulated municipal association is used.

Structure 
A municipal association normally consists of several adjacent municipalities located in the same district. It is controlled by a political representative, chairperson or executive board. Depending on the state, this person may be officially retained or appointed as mayor. 
 In Baden-Württemberg this position is held by the mayor of the appropriate fulfilling municipality.
 In Thuringia there are municipal associations as well as fulfilling municipalities.
 In Bavaria one mayor of a single municipality also acts as municipal chairman of the association.

Tasks
The duties of a municipal association typically encompass
 Setting up land use plans
 Sewage disposal
 Payment transactions
 Cemetery matters
 Fire brigade provision

List

See also
 Amt (country subdivision)
 Municipal associations in Thuringia
 Municipalities of Germany
 Samtgemeinde
 Verbandsgemeinde
 Wolmirstedt

Collective municipalities in Germany
Types of administrative division
Local government organizations